Paragyrodactylus is a genus of monogeneans in the family Gyrodactylidae.

Species
Paragyrodactylus barbatuli Ergens, 1970
Paragyrodactylus iliensis Gvosdev & Martechov, 1953
Paragyrodactylus variegatus You, King, Ye & Cone, 2014

References

Gyrodactylidae
Monogenea genera